Jamie Lee is  a Gaelic football player for Limerick.

Lee takes the frees for Limerick. His father, Billy Lee, was the manager when he played for Limerick. He also takes frees for his club, Newcastle West. He went to Australia in 2020.

References

Year of birth missing (living people)
Irish expatriate sportspeople in Australia
Limerick inter-county Gaelic footballers
Living people